In enzymology, a ketol-acid reductoisomerase is an enzyme that catalyzes the chemical reaction

(R)-2,3-dihydroxy-3-methylbutanoate + NADP+  (S)-2-hydroxy-2-methyl-3-oxobutanoate + NADPH + H+

Thus, the two substrates of this enzyme are (R)-2,3-dihydroxy-3-methylbutanoate and NADP+, whereas its 3 products are (S)-2-hydroxy-2-methyl-3-oxobutanoate, NADPH, and H+.

This enzyme belongs to the family of oxidoreductases, specifically those acting on the CH-OH group of donor with NAD+ or NADP+ as acceptor. The systematic name of this enzyme class is (R)-2,3-dihydroxy-3-methylbutanoate:NADP+ oxidoreductase (isomerizing). Other names in common use include dihydroxyisovalerate dehydrogenase (isomerizing), acetohydroxy acid isomeroreductase, ketol acid reductoisomerase, alpha-keto-beta-hydroxylacyl reductoisomerase, 2-hydroxy-3-keto acid reductoisomerase, acetohydroxy acid reductoisomerase, acetolactate reductoisomerase, dihydroxyisovalerate (isomerizing) dehydrogenase, isomeroreductase, and reductoisomerase. This enzyme participates in valine, leucine and isoleucine biosynthesis and pantothenate and coa biosynthesis.

Structural studies

References

 
 
 
 

EC 1.1.1
NADPH-dependent enzymes
Enzymes of known structure